The following Confederate States Army units and commanders fought in the final military encounter of the American Civil War, the 1865 Appomattox campaign, which lasted from March 29 to April 9 and resulted in Confederate surrender on April 9 at the Appomattox Court House. Order of battle has been compiled from the army organization during the campaign. The Union order of battle is listed separately.

Abbreviations used

Military rank
 Gen = General
 LTG = Lieutenant General
 MG = Major General
 BG = Brigadier General
 Col = Colonel
 Ltc = Lieutenant Colonel
 Maj = Major
 Cpt = Captain
 Lt = Lieutenant
 Sgt = Sergeant

Other
 (w) = wounded
 (mw) = mortally wounded
 (k) = killed in action
 (c) = captured

Army of Northern Virginia

Gen Robert E. Lee, Commanding
Staff:
Chief of staff: Ltc Walter H. Taylor
Assistant adjutants general: Col Charles S. Venable, Col Charles Marshall
Assistant Inspector General: Maj Giles B. Cooke
Chief of artillery: BG William N. Pendleton

First Corps

LTG James Longstreet
Staff:
 Corps medical director: Surgeon John Cullen

Second Corps

MG John B. Gordon
Staff:
 Assistant adjutant general: Maj Robert W. Hunter

Third Corps

LTG A. P. Hill (k, April 2)

Provost Guard
 5th Alabama Battalion: Cpt Wade Ritter

Fourth Corps

LTG Richard H. Anderson

Cavalry Corps

MG Fitzhugh Lee

Department of Richmond

LTG Richard S. Ewell (c, April 6)

Ltc Thomas J. Spencer

Department of North Carolina and Southern Virginia

Notes

References

U.S. War Department, The War of the Rebellion: a Compilation of the Official Records of the Union and Confederate Armies, U.S. Government Printing Office, 1880–1901.
National Park Service: Appomattox Court House (Confederate order of battle).
 Calkins, Chris. The Appomattox Campaign: March 29 – April 9, 1865. Conshohocken, Pennsylvania: Combined Books, 1997. .
 Marvel, William. Lee's Last Retreat: The Flight to Appomattox. Chapel Hill, North Carolina: University of North Carolina Press, 2002. .

American Civil War orders of battle
Appomattox campaign